Koos may refer to:

 Koos (name), a masculine given name and a surname
 Koos (fashion label), a former haute couture fashion label
 Koos (island), in the Bay of Greifswald, Mecklenburg-Vorpommern, Germany
 Koos Group, a Taiwan-based pan-Asian business group
 KOOS, a radio station in North Bend, Oregon, United States
 KTEE, originally KOOS, a radio station in North Bend, Oregon
 Koos/Together, an Estonian political movement